Yunohara Dam is a concrete gravity dam located in Yamaguchi prefecture in Japan. The dam is used for irrigation and water supply. The catchment area of the dam is 185.7 km2. The dam impounds about 62  ha of land when full and can store 2930 thousand cubic meters of water. The construction of the dam was started in 1972 and completed in 1990.

References

Dams in Yamaguchi Prefecture
1990 establishments in Japan